= Caratachea =

Surname

Caratachea is a surname of Basque origin. According to the Dictionary of American Family Names, it is an altered form of Garatachea, a Castilianized form of Garatetxea, which refers to a house named with a derivative of gara ("height, peak") and etxe ("house"). The dictionary notes that the surname Garatetxea is apparently not found in Spain.
